Frode Glesnes  (born 7 October 1974) is one of the founders of the Norwegian Viking metal band Einherjer. He started as guitarist/vocalist, but decided to concentrate on the guitar duties. He did the lead vocals on  Einherjer's  last album, Blot. He started a new band with the other Einherjer members called  Battered. He did the lead vocals on their first demo recording, but they chose a new singer. He also had a couple of projects with Einherjer drummer Gerhard Storesund called Angelgrinder and Beelzebub.

Major discography

With Einherjer

 Dragons of the North (1996)
 Odin Owns Ye All (1998)
 Norwegian Native Art (2000)
 Blot (2003)
 Norrøn (2011)
 Av oss, for oss (2014)

With Battered

 Battered (2006)

References

Living people
Norwegian black metal musicians
Norwegian rock singers
Norwegian rock guitarists
Norwegian heavy metal singers
Norwegian heavy metal guitarists
Norwegian multi-instrumentalists
Place of birth missing (living people)
1974 births
21st-century Norwegian singers
21st-century Norwegian guitarists
21st-century Norwegian male singers